R. L. Harris Dam is a hydroelectric dam in Randolph County, Alabama, the fourth of four such dams on the Tallapoosa River. 

R. L. Harris Lake, also known as Lake Wedowee, was impounded April 20, 1983 and named for Rother L. "Judge" Harris, an Alabama Power director and vice president of electric operations. The lake covers 10,600 acres (43 km²) with 271 miles (436 km) of shoreline and a maximum capacity of 426,000 acre-feet. The nearest town is Wedowee, Alabama.

The Harris hydropower facility has two generation units with a combined 135-megawatt generating capacity. It is an excellent recreational lake with fishing opportunities for largemouth bass, spotted bass, bluegill and other sunfish, crappie, catfish, striped bass, hybrid and white bass. Alabama Power maintains six public access sites on the lake.

References 

Dams in Alabama
Hydroelectric power plants in Alabama
Alabama Power dams
Buildings and structures in Clay County, Alabama
Dams completed in 1983
1983 establishments in Alabama